Bartonjo Rotich (25 May 1938 – 7 October 2019) is a runner from Kenya who specialised in 400 metres and 400 metres hurdles.

He went to Alliance High School. Rotich competed at the 1956 Summer Olympics, but failed to advance past 400 metres heats and 4x400 metres relay heats.

At the 1958 British Empire and Commonwealth Games, he finished third in the 440 yards hurdles race. By this result he became the first Kenyan athlete to win a medal at any intercontinental championships alongside Arere Anentia, who won bronze medal over 6 miles race. He competed at the 1960 Summer Olympics and he reached 400 metres hurdles semifinals and 400 metres quarterfinals.

He was the chairman of Athletics Kenya from 1968 to 1972.

References

External link

1938 births
2019 deaths
Kenyan male sprinters
Kenyan male hurdlers
Athletes (track and field) at the 1956 Summer Olympics
Athletes (track and field) at the 1960 Summer Olympics
Olympic athletes of Kenya
Athletes (track and field) at the 1958 British Empire and Commonwealth Games
Commonwealth Games bronze medallists for Kenya
Commonwealth Games medallists in athletics
Alumni of Alliance High School (Kenya)
People from Baringo County
Medallists at the 1958 British Empire and Commonwealth Games